Vatica obscura is a species of plant in the family Dipterocarpaceae. It is endemic to Sri Lanka. It is an endangered species threatened by habitat loss.

References

obscura
Endemic flora of Sri Lanka
Trees of Sri Lanka
Endangered flora of Asia
Taxonomy articles created by Polbot